Monjurur Rahman Manik is a Bangladeshi footballer who plays as a defender. He currently plays for Bangladesh Police FC.

International career
On 29 August 2018, Monjurur made his senior career debut against Sri Lanka during an international friendly.

Honours

Club
Feni Soccer Club
Independence Cup runner-up: 2013

References 

1996 births
Living people
Bangladeshi footballers
Bangladesh international footballers
Sheikh Jamal Dhanmondi Club players
Association football defenders
Footballers at the 2018 Asian Games
Asian Games competitors for Bangladesh
Abahani Limited (Chittagong) players
Feni SC players
People from Tangail District
21st-century Bengalis
Saif SC players
Muktijoddha Sangsad KC players
Bangladesh Police FC players